Corazón (heart) is the second studio album by Colombian singer Fonseca. One of the singles, "Te mando flores", won a 2006 Latin Grammy Award, it was the international breakthrough of Fonseca and became one of his signature songs.

Track listing
 "Hace tiempo" – 3:37
 "Como me mira" – 3:47
 "Corazón" – 4:18
 "Sigo aquí cantando" – 4:01
 "Te mando flores" – 4:28
 "Lagartija azul" – 3:59
 "Casa" – 3:09
 "Mercedes" – 2:55
 "Viene subiendo" – 4:04
 "Idilio" – 3:47
 "Vengo a hablar" – 4:40

Certifications

References

Fonseca (singer) albums
2005 albums